Las Cruces is a municipality in the northern Guatemalan department of El Petén. The municipality was founded in 2011 when it split off from the territory of La Libertad.

References

Municipalities of the Petén Department